Hans Podlipnik-Castillo and Andrei Vasilevski were the defending champions but chose not to defend their title.

Lorenzo Giustino and Gonçalo Oliveira won the title after defeating Lucas Miedler and Sebastian Ofner 6–2, 7–6(7–4) in the final.

Seeds

Draw

External Links
 Main Draw

Shymkent Challenger - Doubles
2018 Doubles